Grand Valley (Martin Field) Aerodrome  is located  southeast of Grand Valley, Ontario, Canada.

See also
Grand Valley North Aerodrome
Grand Valley (Madill Field) Aerodrome
Grand Valley/Luther Field Aerodrome
Grand Valley (Black Field) Aerodrome

References

Registered aerodromes in Ontario